John F. Kennedy High School is a high school located in Cheektowaga, New York, in the United States. It is purported to be the first public school in the United States to be named for the sitting president.

Academics 
Offers many classes in many subjects.

History 
John F. Kennedy High School was formed in 1962. It would later be named for President John F. Kennedy, the first school to do so. Until 1997, the middle school grades were housed in the high school until the district formed the new middle school.

The forester Bruce Kershner was a teacher at JFK high school until his death in 2007.

Selected former principals 
Previous assignment and reason for departure denoted in parentheses
Mr. Henry M. Andrzejewski–1967-1978 (Assistant Principal/Director of Athletics - John F. Kennedy High School, retired)
Mr. Daniel F. Mahoney–1977-1996 (Principal - Woodrow Wilson Elementary, retired)
Mr. Richard E. Andrzejewski–1996-2002 (Assistant Principal - John F. Kennedy Junior/Senior High School, retired)
Mr. Stephen A. Bovino–2002-2007 (Assistant Principal - Williamsville South High School, named Assistant Superintendent for Human Resources of Kenmore-Town of Tonawanda Union Free School District)
Ms. Bobbi Lin Meyers [interim]–2007 (Technology Integrator - Cheektowaga-Sloan Union Free School District, returned to position)
Mr. Lawrence Ljungberg–2007-2010 (Principal - Global Concepts Charter School, named Dean of Instruction of Oracle Charter School)

Selected former assistant principals 
Previous assignment and reason for departure denoted in parentheses
Mr. Henry Andrzejwski–1960-1968 (Social Studies teacher - Sloan High School, named Principal of John F. Kennedy High School)
Mr. Daniel Mahoney–1969-? (Social Studies teacher - JFK High School, named Principal of Woodrow Wilson Elementary)
Mr. Dennis E. Piekarski–?-1972 (Physical Education/Health teacher - John F. Kennedy High School, named Principal of Woodrow Wilson Elementary)
Mr. Richard Andrzejewski–1988-1996 (Math teacher - John F. Kennedy High School, named Principal of John F. Kennedy Junior/Senior High School)
Mr. David Peters–1996-1997 (Social Studies teacher - John F. Kennedy Junior/Senior High School, named Principal of John F. Kennedy Middle School)

Athletics 
Fall sports: Girls soccer, cheerleading, cross country, football, and volleyball 
Winter sports: Basketball, bowling, and cheerleading
Spring sports: Baseball, softball, boys tennis, and track, and field.

References

External links
John F. Kennedy High School Home Page
Cheektowaga Sloan School District Home Page

Public high schools in New York (state)
High schools in Erie County, New York